Paul Ludwig Ewald von Kleist (8 August 1881 – 13 November 1954) was a German field marshal during World War II. Kleist was the commander of Panzer Group Kleist (later 1st Panzer Army), the first operational formation of several Panzer corps in the Wehrmacht during the Battle of France, the Battle of Belgium, the Invasion of Yugoslavia and Operation Barbarossa, the invasion of the Soviet Union.

During the Battle of France, units under Kleist's command included Heinz Guderian's armoured corps and spearheaded the "blitzkrieg" attack through the Ardennes forest, outflanking the Maginot Line. His  panzer divisions eventually pushed deep into France, resulting in Allied defeat.

Kleist was appointed commander-in-chief of Army Group A during the last days of Case Blue, the 1942 German summer offensive in southern Russia. His disagreements with Hitler over strategic decisions led to his dismissal in March 1944 after the German defeat in right-bank Ukraine.

Following the war, Kleist was extradited to the Soviet Union where he was sentenced to 25 years in prison for war crimes; he died in prison.

Early military career
Paul Ludwig Ewald von Kleist was born in Braunfels to the noble family Kleist, an old Pomeranian family with a long history of military service. There had been two previous Prussian field marshals in the family. His father was Geheimer Studienrat Christof Hugo von Kleist, a high ranking civil servant.

At the age of 18, Kleist joined the Prussian field artillery regiment, "General Feldzeugmeister" No. 3 on 9 March 1900 as a fahnenjunker. He was commissioned as a leutnant on 18 August 1901. On 22 March 1914 he was promoted to captain and joined the Leib-Husaren-Regiment No. 1.

During the First World War, Kleist served on the Eastern Front and commanded a cavalry squadron at the Battle of Tannenberg. From 1915 to 1918 he served as a staff officer of the Guards Cavalry Division on the Western Front.

Inter-war period
After the First World War ended, Kleist joined the Freikorps and participated in the Latvian and Estonian Wars of Independence as a member of the Iron Division. In June 1919, he led an attack group during the Battle of Cēsis.

Kleist joined the Reichswehr in 1920. From 1924 to 1928 he was assigned as a tactics instructor at the Hannover Cavalry School. In 1928 he served as the chief of staff of the 2nd Cavalry Division in Breslau, then from 1929 to 1931 he held the same position in the 3rd Division in Berlin. Kleist was promoted to Colonel in 1931 and was given command of the 9th (Prussian) Infantry Regiment in Potsdam. At the beginning of 1932, he was given command of the 2nd Cavalry Division. In October 1932, he was promoted to Major General.

Kleist was a monarchist, and did not heavily involve himself in the politics of the Weimar Republic. After the Nazis seized power the Reichswehr was united with the newly formed Wehrmacht. On 1 December 1933 he was promoted to lieutenant general. In October 1934 he was given command of the "Breslau Army", which was later reorganized into the VIII. Army Corps. In 1935 he was given command of the newly formed military district VIII responsible for Silesia while simultaneously serving as the commanding general of the VIII. Army Corps. On 1 August 1936 he was promoted to General of the Cavalry.

In February 1938, during the Blomberg–Fritsch affair when Hitler purged the army of staff who were unsympathetic to the Nazi regime, Kleist was forced to retire from service for his monarchist attitudes. Despite his forced retirement, Kleist received a significant departing honor when he was authorized to wear the uniform of the 8th cavalry regiment. To secure his retirement, he acquired a property near Breslau.

World War II

At the outbreak of the Second World War Kleist was recalled to active duty and led the XXII Motorised Corps in the Invasion of Poland, during which his corps broke through the southern wing of the Polish army.

Invasion of France

In May 1940 Panzer Group Kleist was formed, the first operational formation of several Panzer corps in the Wehrmacht. Panzer Group Kleist, consisting of XIV Corps, XLI Panzer Corps, and XIX Panzer Corps under Heinz Guderian, played a pivotal role in the Invasion of Belgium, France and the Low Countries. On 10 May, it spearheaded the German breakthrough in the Ardennes, as it advanced through southern Belgium, Kleist and Guderian clashed over where the main point of effort should fall. Kleist, Guderian's immediate superior, pressed for the main point to come at Flize, further west than Sedan. Kleist argued that the blow would avoid a double river crossing at the Meuse (at Sedan) and Ardennes canal (to the west of Sedan). Moreover, the blow would strike at the dividing line between the French Ninth Army and the French Second Army. The shift of operations further north would also disperse concentration (or Schwerpunkt) and disrupt the intense planning of the German tactical units, who had been in training for the Sedan attack and an advance north-west, for months. He also felt that a regrouping period in front of Sedan would delay the assault for 24 hours and allow the French to bring up reinforcements. Kleist agreed that such a delay was unacceptable, so he agreed to Guderian's plan. Panzer Group Kleist overwhelmed the French defenses at Sedan, advanced west and reached the sea, forming a huge pocket containing several Belgian, British, and French armies.

Invasion of Yugoslavia

Kleist was promoted to Generaloberst on 19 July 1940 and received the Knight's Cross of the Iron Cross. In April 1941 Panzer Group Kleist was renamed to 1st Panzer Group and spearheaded the invasion of Yugoslavia. Deployed against central Yugoslavia (Serbia), units of the 1st Panzer Group were the first to enter Belgrade.

Invasion of the Soviet Union

In June 1941 with the launching of Operation Barbarossa, Kleist led the 1st Panzer Group as part of Army Group Southtasked with the capture of Moldavia and Ukraineand saw success in the initial phase of the invasion, advancing deep into Ukraine. The 1st Panzer Group broke through the Stalin Line, then defeated the five mechanized corps of the Soviet 5th Army and 6th Army in the Battle of Brody (23 to 30 June 1941). In July 1941 during the Battle of Uman, the 1st Panzer Group broke through the Soviet Southern Front's lines, leading to the encirclement and annihilation of the Soviet 6th and 12th armies to the southeast of Uman city (in present-day Cherkasy Oblast). During the First Battle of Kiev of August–September 1941, 1st Panzer Group's northward turn from central Ukraine in conjunction with 2nd Panzer Group's southward advance from Smolensk led to the encirclement and destruction of the entire Soviet Southwestern Front east of Kiev, inflicting over 600,000 losses on the Red Army. However, the campaign had been costly, by then the German forces had just half the tanks they had had three months earlier.

After operations at Kiev concluded, Kleist's 1st Panzer Army advanced east to capture the important industrial Donbas region. On 26 September 1941 the Battle of the Sea of Azov began as the Southern Front launched an attack on the northern shores of the Sea of Azov against the German 11th Army advancing into the Crimea. On 1 October the 1st Panzer Army swept south and encircled the two attacking Soviet 9th and 18th armies at Melitopol (Zaporizhzhia Oblast); by 11 October both Soviet armies had been destroyed and the 1st Panzer Army had taken the Donbas. The 1st Panzer Army then attacked east along the shore of the Sea of Azov toward Rostov near the mouth of the Don river, the last barrier before the Caucasus.

On 17 November 1941 the German forces forced their way across the Mius River and launched an offensive against the Southern Front at Rostov. On 19 November 1941 the 1st Panzer Army reached Rostov and the following day, they seized bridges over the river Don. Three days after reaching Rostov the 1st Panzer Army had captured the city. However, on 27 November the Southern Front, as part of the Rostov Strategic Offensive Operation, counter-attacked the 1st Panzer Army's over-extended spearhead from the north, forcing them to pull out of Rostov. By 2 December 1941, the Soviet forces had retaken Rostov and forced the 1st Panzer Army to withdraw back to the Mius River, near Taganrog. This marked the first major German withdrawal of the war. On 18 February 1942 Kleist was awarded the Oak Leaves to his Knight's Cross.

Operation Fredericus

During the Second Battle of Kharkov on 17 May 1942 as part of Operation Fredericus, Kleist's 1st Panzer Army attacked the Barvenkovo bridgehead from the south, advancing up to ten kilometres in the first day of the attack. On 19 May, the German 6th Army led by General Friedrich Paulus launched an offensive north of the bridgehead, encircling the Soviet 6th Army and 57th Army. After six days of encirclement, both armies were destroyed. By 28 May Kleist and Paulus' armies had captured 240,000 prisoners and destroyed or captured over 1250 Soviet tanks and 2000 artillery pieces.

Caucasus offensive and withdrawal

The summer of 1942 saw Army Group South subdivided into Army Group A and B. Army Group A, which included Kleist's 1st Panzer Army, had the task of leading the Axis thrust into the Caucasus in the execution of Case Blue, the German offensive which aimed to capture the important oilfields of Grozny and Baku. The 1st Panzer Army was to spearhead the attack. Army Group A advanced deep into Southern Russia, capturing Rostov, Maykop, Krasnodar and the Kuban region. However, heavy Soviet resistance and the long distances from Axis sources of supply eventually reduced the Axis offensive to local advances only and prevented the Army Group A from capturing their ultimate objectives.

On 22 November 1942, Kleist replaced Field Marshal Wilhelm List as commander of Army Group A near the end of Case Blue. Hitler ordered him to hold position and to resume the offensive should the Axis forces take Stalingrad. This possibility ended after the Soviets launched counter-offensives Operation Uranus (November 1942), which encircled the German 6th Army in Stalingrad, and Operation Little Saturn (December 1942 to February 1943). Little Saturn aimed to cut off Army Group A in the Caucasus, however, the limited scope of the Soviet offensive gave Kleist enough time to withdraw his Army Group A in the direction of the Kuban, abandoning the Caucasus.

Battle of the Dnieper and dismissal

On 1 February 1943 Kleist was promoted to Field Marshal. In July 1943 the Red Army launched a massive offensive along the Dnieper river. By December 1943 the Soviets had conquered the west bank of the Dnieper, and Kleist's Army Group A was forced to retreat to southwest Ukraine. In December 1943 the Soviets launched the Dnieper-Carpathian Offensive against Erich von Manstein's re-constituted Army Group South, intending to capture all of the Ukrainian and Moldavian territories under the Axis forces. As part of the initial phase of the offensive, the Soviet 3rd Ukrainian Front to the south launched the Nikopol–Krivoi Rog Offensive against Kleist's Army Group A. Proceeding slowly at first, the front eventually destroyed the salient projecting around Kryvyi Rih and Nikopol, costing the Germans the important mining operations there as well as nearly encircling the reformed German 6th Army. By the end of March 1944 the Soviets had recovered most of right-bank Ukraine and the Germans were defeated with 20 divisions either destroyed, disbanded or requiring major rebuilding, while another 60 divisions were reduced to 50% of their establishment strength. Kleist had disagreed with Hitler over the withdrawal of Army Group A during the offensive. He had demanded permission to pull back his forces to more defensible positions, however, Hitler ordered his armies to stand where they were. Hitler blamed his generals for the overall strategic success of Soviet armies and on 30 March 1944, Kleist was dismissed and replaced by Ferdinand Schörner.

After the 20 July plot to assassinate Hitler failed (1944), the Gestapo implicated and arrested Kleist due to the involvement of his cousin Ewald von Kleist-Schmenzin in the Oster conspiracy. Kleist avoided trial and was later released.

Trial and death
Kleist was arrested in late April 1945 in Bavaria by United States' troops, and handed over to the British Army. In September 1946 he was extradited to Yugoslavia, where after a trial he was sentenced to fifteen years in prison for war crimes.

In 1948 he was extradited to the Soviet Union, where he was charged with war crimes. After a trial he was sentenced to 25 years in prison.

On 13 November 1954 Kleist died of heart failure in Vladimir Central Prison. He was the most senior ranking soldier among the German prisoners of war in the Soviet Union to die in Russian captivity. Kleist was buried at the Prince Vladimir cemetery near the prison walls. 

In October 1955, after German Chancellor Konrad Adenauer's visit to Moscow, the Soviet Union repatriated the remaining 14,000 German prisoners of war convicted of war crimes. Kleist's body was exhumed, dressed in a field marshal's uniform and sent home to Germany.

Awards
 Iron Cross (1914) 2nd Class (4 October 1914) & 1st Class (27 January 1915)
 Clasp to the Iron Cross (1939) & 2nd Class (17 September 1939) & 1st Class (27 September 1939)
 Hanseatic Cross
 Knight's Cross of the Iron Cross with Oak Leaves and Swords
 Knight's Cross on 15 May 1940 as General der Kavallerie and commanding general of XXII. Armeekorps (Panzergruppe "von Kleist")
 Oak Leaves on 17 February 1942 as Generaloberst and Commander-in-chief of Panzergruppe 1
 Swords on 30 March 1944 as Generalfeldmarschall and Commander-in-chief Heeresgruppe A

References

Citations

Bibliography
 Leon Goldensohn: Die Nürnberger Interviews. Gespräche mit Angeklagten und Zeugen. (Original: The Nuremberg Interviews. New York, 2004). Herausgegeben und eingeleitet von Robert Gellately. Artemis und Winkler, Düsseldorf / Zürich 2005, .

External links
 

1881 births
1954 deaths
People from Braunfels
People from the Rhine Province 
German Army World War II field marshals
Paul Ewald
German Army personnel of World War I
Prussian Army personnel
Recipients of the Knight's Cross of the Iron Cross with Oak Leaves and Swords
Recipients of the clasp to the Iron Cross, 1st class
Recipients of the Order of Michael the Brave, 1st class
Grand Crosses of the Order of Merit of the Republic of Hungary (military)
Commanders of the Military Order of Savoy
German prisoners of war in World War II held by the United States
German people who died in Soviet detention
German people convicted of war crimes
People extradited from Germany
People extradited to Yugoslavia
People extradited from Yugoslavia
People extradited to the Soviet Union
Lieutenant generals of the Reichswehr
20th-century Freikorps personnel
Military personnel from Hesse